Pearcea is a genus of tropical herbaceous plants in the family Gesneriaceae native to western South America. It is classified in tribe Gloxinieae and is closely related to the genus Kohleria, in which some of its species were previously included.  The genus Parakohleria has recently been synonymized under Pearcea, a conclusion later supported by molecular analyses that showed that Pearcea hypocyrtiflora was nested within the former Parakohlerias.

The best-known and most widely cultivated species is Pearcea hypocyrtiflora, a low-growing herb with attractively marked leaves and unusual bubble-like red or orange flowers.

Species
Species include:
Pearcea abunda (Wiehler) L.P. Kvist & L.E. Skog
Pearcea bilabiata L.P. Kvist & L.E. Skog
Pearcea cordata L.P. Kvist & L.E. Skog
Pearcea glabrata L.P. Kvist & L.E. Skog
Pearcea gracilis L.P. Kvist & L.E. Skog
Pearcea grandifolia L.P. Kvist & L.E. Skog
Pearcea hispidissima (Wiehler) L.P. Kvist & L.E. Skog
Pearcea intermedia L.P. Kvist & L.E. Skog
Pearcea hypocyrtiflora (Hook. f.) Regel
Pearcea pileifolia J.L. Clark & L.E. Skog
Pearcea purpurea (Poepp.) L.P. Kvist & L.E. Skog
Pearcea reticulata (Fritsch) L.P. Kvist & L.E. Skog
Pearcea rhodotricha (Cuatrec.) L.P. Kvist & L.E. Skog
Pearcea schimpfii Mansf.
Pearcea sprucei (Britton) L.P. Kvist & L.E. Skog
Pearcea strigosa L.P. Kvist & L.E. Skog

References

Roalson, E.H., J.K. Boggan, L.E. Skog, & E.A. Zimmer. 2005. Untangling the Gloxinieae (Gesneriaceae). I. Phylogenetic patterns and generic boundaries inferred from nuclear, chloroplast, and morphological cladistic data sets. Taxon 54 (2): 389–410. 
Wiehler, H. 1978. Parakohleria, a new South American genus in the Gesneriaceae.  Selbyana 5(1): 4–10.

External links
Kvist, L.P. & L.E. Skog. 1996. Revision of Pearcea (Gesneriaceae). Smithsonian Contrib. Bot. 84: 1-47 (pdf file).

 
Gesneriaceae genera
Taxa named by Eduard August von Regel